Anni may refer to:

 The popular name of Mohamed Nasheed (born 1967), third president of the second republic of the Maldives
 Ani, Armenia
 Anni Anwander, former West German slalom canoeist
 Anni Dewani (1982–2010), Swedish female murder victim
 Anni Domingo (born 1950s), British actress, director and writer
 Anni, India, or Ani, a subdivision of Kullu district, Himachal Pradesh, India
 Anni Assembly constituency
 Ani, Iran (disambiguation), places in Iran
 Anni (1948 film), an Austrian-German film directed by Max Neufeld
 Anni (1951 film), a Tamil film directed by K. S. Prakash Rao
 Anni (TV series), a Tamil TV show written and produced by K. Balachander
 Anni, a character in the puzzle game Baba Is You

See also 
 Ani (disambiguation)
 Annie (disambiguation)
 Any (disambiguation)